Wacław Leszczyński may refer to:
 Wacław Leszczyński (died 1628), voivode of Kalisz, chancellor
 Wacław Leszczyński (1605-1666) , Prince-Bishop of Warmia, primate of Poland, see List of bishops of Warmia

See also 
 Wacław